Prickly heath is a common name for several plants and may refer to:

Gaultheria mucronata, native to South America
Leptecophylla juniperina, native to Australia and New Zealand